Engelberger Aa (or Engelbergeraa) is a river in Switzerland. It rises west of Surenenpass in the Canton of Uri, flows through the valley of Engelberg (Obwalden) and Nidwalden. At Buochs, it empties into Lake Lucerne and is thus a tributary of the Reuss, which drains that lake.

Rivers of Switzerland
Rivers of Nidwalden
Rivers of Obwalden